The Rwanda women's under-19 cricket team represents Rwanda in international under-19 women's cricket. The team is administered by the Rwanda Cricket Association (RCA).

Rwanda qualified for the inaugural ICC Under-19 Women's T20 World Cup via winning the Africa Qualifier, thereby becoming the first Rwandan team to qualify for an ICC tournament. They reached the Super Six stage at the tournament, winning two of their matches.

History
Rwanda competed in the Women's African Under-19s Championship between 2009–10 and 2014–15.

The inaugural Women's Under-19 World Cup was scheduled to take place in January 2021, but was postponed multiple times due to the COVID-19 pandemic. The tournament was eventually scheduled to take place in 2023, in South Africa. Rwanda competed in the Africa Qualifier for the tournament in September 2022. They finished second in their group, winning three of their four matches to qualify for the semi-finals. They went on to beat Uganda in the semi-finals and Tanzania, by 6 wickets, in the final. It was the first time that a Rwandan side had qualified for a Cricket World Cup in any format. 

Rwanda announced their squad for the tournament on 18 December 2022, with Leonard Nhamburo announced as Head Coach of the side. Rwanda beat both Zimbabwe and the West Indies as they reached the Super Six stage of the tournament. Rwanda bowler Henriette Ishimwe took four wickets in four balls against Zimbabwe.

Recent call-ups
The table below lists all the players who have been selected in recent squads for Rwanda under-19s. Currently, this only includes the squad for the 2023 ICC Under-19 Women's T20 World Cup.

Records & statistics
International match summary

As of 22 January 2023

Youth Women's Twenty20 record versus other nations

As of 22 January 2023

Leading runs scorers

Leading wickets takers

Highest individual innings

Highest individual bowling figures

Highest team totals

Lowest team totals

Under-19 World Cup record

References

Women's Under-19 cricket teams
C
Rwanda in international cricket